The 1988–89 Scottish Second Division was won by Albion Rovers who, along with second placed Alloa Athletic, were promoted to the First Division. Stenhousemuir finished bottom.

Table

Promoted: Albion Rovers, Alloa Athletic

References 

 Scottish Football Archive

Scottish Second Division seasons
3
Scot